Steven, Stephen, Steve or Stevie Crawford may refer to:

Steve Crawford (Pennsylvania politician) (born 1959), chief of staff for former Pennsylvania Governor Ed Rendell
Steve Crawford (baseball) (born 1958), American baseball player
Stevie Crawford (born 1974), Scottish footballer
T. Stephen Crawford (1900–1987), American chemical engineer
Stephen Crawford (politician), Canadian politician